In Greek mythology, Thurimachus (Ancient Greek: Θουρίμαχος) was the seventh king of Sicyon who reigned for 45 years.

Family 
Thurimachus was the son and heir of King Aegyrus, descendant of the city's founder Aegialeus (an autochthon). He succeeded by his son Leucippus, father of Calchinia.

Mythology 
During Thurimachus's reign, Inachus became the first king of the Argives.

Notes

References 

 Pausanias, Description of Greece with an English Translation by W.H.S. Jones, Litt.D., and H.A. Ormerod, M.A., in 4 Volumes. Cambridge, MA, Harvard University Press; London, William Heinemann Ltd. 1918. . Online version at the Perseus Digital Library
 Pausanias, Graeciae Descriptio. 3 vols. Leipzig, Teubner. 1903. Greek text available at the Perseus Digital Library.

Princes in Greek mythology
Kings in Greek mythology
Mythological kings of Sicyon
Sicyonian characters in Greek mythology